Dominican College may refer to:

Higher education
Dominican University College, in Ottawa, Ontario, Canada
Dominican University of California, formerly Dominican College, in San Rafael, California, U.S.
St. Mary's Dominican College, a defunct college in New Orleans, Louisiana, U.S.
Dominican University New York, formerly Dominican College, a four-year private college in Orangeburg, New York, U.S.
Dominican College of Racine, a defunct college in Racine, Wisconsin, U.S.

Other education
Cabra Dominican College, a high school in Adelaide, South Australia, Australia
Dominican College, Fortwilliam, a grammar school in Belfast, Northern Ireland
Dominican College, Portstewart, a grammar school on north coast of Northern Ireland
Dominican College Newbridge, a private secondary school in County Kildare, Ireland
Dominican College Sion Hill, a girls' secondary school in Blackrock, County Dublin, Ireland
St Rose's Dominican College, a former girls' school in Belfast, Northern Ireland
Dominican College, Griffith Avenue, a girls' secondary school in Drumcondra, Dublin, Ireland
St. Dominic's College, Cabra, a girls' secondary school in Cabra, Dublin

See also
Dominican University (disambiguation)